Crepidula, commonly known as the slipper snails, slipper limpets, or slipper shells, is a genus of sea snails, marine gastropod mollusks in the family Calyptraeidae. This family includes the slipper snails (Crepidula), hat snails (Calyptraea), spiny slipper snails (Bostrycapulus),  and cup-and-saucer snails (Crucibulum) as well as Crepipatella, Siphopatella, Grandicrepidula, and Maoricrypta.

These recent changes in the definition of Crepidula are based on both DNA sequence data as well as anatomical work.  Dissections of various calyptraeids show that species that are now placed in Grandicrepidula and Maoricrypta are anatomically very different from the true Crepidula.  If only the shells are examined this difference is not apparent.  This distinction is supported by DNA sequence data from 3 genes (COI, 16S and 28S).

The genus Crepidula is probably the best studied group within the calyptraeids.  A variety of species are commonly used in developmental, ecological, and behavioral research.  They have been the major focus of research on protandrous sex-change in marine invertebrates and have been used to demonstrate that sex change is environmentally mediated (the timing of sex change depends on association with other individual snails). Crepidula fornicata and Crepidula onyx are well-studied examples of invasive, exotic species in marine habitats.

Due to their simple shells and plastic morphology, calyptraeid taxonomy is challenging.  In many cases distinct species with similar-looking shells have been lumped into a single species with either global or unusual distributions.  In these cases close examination of the mode of development or of DNA data is vital to verify the species identity.  Because such taxonomic lumping is difficult to clear from the internet or from the literature many species range estimates available on the internet include dubious data or data from species that have been taken out of synonymy.

Species 

Species within the genus Crepidula include:

 Crepidula adunca G. B. Sowerby I, 1825
 Crepidula aeola Dall, 1927
 Crepidula aplysioides Reeve, 1859
 Crepidula arenata Broderip, 1834
 Crepidula argentina Simone, Pastorino & Penchaszadeh, 2000
 Crepidula atrasolea Collin, 2000
 Crepidula badisparsa Collin, 2005
 Crepidula cachimilla Cledon, Simone & Penchaszadeh, 2004
 Crepidula carioca Simone, 2006
 Crepidula cerithicola (C.B.Adams, 1852)
 Crepidula complanata Krauss, 1848
 Crepidula convexa Say, 1822 - synonym: Crepidula glauca
 Crepidula coquimbensis Brown & Olivares, 1996
 Crepidula cymbaeformis Conrad, 1844
 Crepidula depressa Say, 1822
 Crepidula derjugini Golikov & Kussakin, 1962
 Crepidula excavata Broderip, 1834
 Crepidula fimbriata Reeve, 1859
 Crepidula fornicata (Linnaeus, 1758) - Common slipper shell, common Atlantic slippersnail, boat shell, quarterdeck shell.
 Crepidula glottidiarum Dall, 1905
 Crepidula goreensis Gmelin, 1791
 Crepidula huertae Collin, 2019
 Crepidula incurva (Broderip, 1834)
 Crepidula intratesta Simone, 2006
 Crepidula lessonii (Broderip, 1834)
 Crepidula maculosa Conrad, 1846
 Crepidula margarita Simone, 2006
 Crepidula marginalis  Broderip, 1834
 Crepidula moulinsii Michaud, 1829
 Crepidula naticarum Williamson, 1905
 Crepidula navicella (Lesson, 1831)
 Crepidula navicula (Mörch, 1877)
 Crepidula nivea C.B. Adams, 1852
 Crepidula norrisiarum Williamson, 1905
 Crepidula nummaria Gould, 1846
 Crepidula onyx G. B. Sowerby I, 1824 - onyx slippersnail
 Crepidula perforans Valenciennes, 1846
 Crepidula philippiana Gallardo, 1977
 Crepidula plana Say, 1822
 Crepidula porcellana (Linnaeus, 1758)
 Crepidula protea (d'Orbigny, 1841)
 Crepidula pyguaia Simone, 2006
 Crepidula rostrata C. B. Adams, 1852
 Crepidula striolata Menke, 1851
 Crepidula unguiformis Lamarck, 1822
 Crepidula ustulatulina Collin, 2002
 Crepidula williamsi Coe, 1947
 Crepidula wolfae Collin, 2019

Species brought into synonymy
 Crepidula aculeata (Gmelin, 1791): synonym of Bostrycapulus aculeatus (Gmelin, 1791)
 Crepidula aculeata (Gmelin, 1791) sensu Zenetos et al.2004: synonym of Bostrycapulus odites Collin, 2005
 Crepidula acuta H. C. Lea, 1842: synonym of Crepidula convexa Say, 1822
 Crepidula adspersa Dunker, 1846: synonym of Crepidula porcellana Lamarck, 1801
 Crepidula bilobata Reeve, 1859: synonym of Crepidula lingulata Gould, 1846: synonym of Crepipatella lingulata (Gould, 1846)
 Crepidula calceolina Deshayes, 1830: synonym of Crepidula unguiformis Lamarck, 1822
 Crepidula californica Tryon, 1886: synonym of Crepidula aculeata (Gmelin, 1791): synonym of Bostrycapulus aculeatus (Gmelin, 1791)
 Crepidula calyptraeiformis Deshayes, 1830: synonym of Bostrycapulus calyptraeiformis (Deshayes, 1830)
 Crepidula candida Risso, 1826: synonym of Crepidula unguiformis Lamarck, 1822
 Crepidula capensis Quoy & Gaimard, 1835: synonym of Crepipatella capensis (Quoy & Gaimard, 1835)
 Crepidula cataldi Parenzan, 1970: synonym of Crepidula unguiformis Lamarck, 1822
 Crepidula coei Berry, 1950: synonym of Crepidula naticarum Williamson, 1905
 Crepidula contorta Quoy & Gaimard, 1832: synonym of Maoricrypta monoxyla (Lesson, 1830)
 Crepidula costata G. B. Sowerby I, 1824: synonym of Maoricrypta costata (G. B. Sowerby I, 1824)
 Crepidula costata Deshayes, 1830: synonym of Maoricrypta costata (G. B. Sowerby I, 1824)
 Crepidula costulata Dunker, 1852: synonym of Crepidula incurva (Broderip, 1834)
 Crepidula crepidula (Linnaeus, 1767): synonym of Crepidula unguiformis Lamarck, 1822
 Crepidula depressa Deshayes, 1830: synonym of Crepidula dilatata Lamarck, 1822: synonym of Crepipatella dilatata (Lamarck, 1822)
 Crepidula deshayesii de Folin, 1867: synonym of Crepidula unguiformis Lamarck, 1822
 Crepidula desmoulinsi Locard, 1886: synonym of Crepidula moulinsii Michaud, 1829
 Crepidula dilatata Lamarck, 1822: synonym of Crepipatella dilatata (Lamarck, 1822)
 Crepidula dorsata (Broderip, 1834): synonym of Crepipatella dorsata (Broderip, 1834)
 Crepidula excisa Philippi, 1849: synonym of Ergaea walshi (Reeve, 1859)
 Crepidula explanata Gould, 1853: synonym of Crepidula perforans (Valenciennes, 1846)
 Crepidula exuviata Reeve, 1859: synonym of Crepidula perforans (Valenciennes, 1846)
 Crepidula fasciata de Roissy, 1805: synonym of Crepidula unguiformis Lamarck, 1822
 Crepidula fecunda Gallardo, 1979: synonym of Crepipatella peruviana (Lamarck, 1822)
 Crepidula fissurata G. B. Sowerby II, 1883: synonym of Crepipatella lingulata (Gould, 1846)
 Crepidula foliacea Broderip, 1834: synonym of Crepidula aculeata (Gmelin, 1791): synonym of Bostrycapulus aculeatus (Gmelin, 1791)
 Crepidula gibbosa Defrance, 1818: synonym of Crepidula moulinsii Michaud, 1829
 Crepidula glauca Say, 1822: synonym of Crepidula convexa Say, 1822
 Crepidula grandis Middendorff, 1849: synonym of Grandicrepidula grandis (Middendorff, 1849)
 Crepidula gravispinosa Kuroda & Habe, 1950: synonym of Crepidula aculeata (Gmelin, 1791): synonym of Bostrycapulus aculeatus (Gmelin, 1791)
 Crepidula hochstetteriana Wilkens, 1922 : synonym of † Maoricrypta radiata (Hutton, 1873) 
 Crepidula immersa Angas, 1865: synonym of Maoricrypta immersa (Angas, 1865)
 Crepidula incurva Zittel, 1864: synonym of † Crepidula wilckensi Finlay, 1924 : synonym of Maoricrypta radiata (Hutton, 1873) †
 Crepidula italica Defrance, 1818: synonym of Crepidula unguiformis Lamarck, 1822
 Crepidula lamina H. C. Lea, 1843: synonym of Crepidula plana Say, 1822
 Crepidula lingulata Gould, 1846: synonym of Crepipatella lingulata (Gould, 1846)
 Crepidula lirata Reeve, 1859: synonym of Crepidula incurva (Broderip, 1834)
 Crepidula maculata Quoy & Gaimard, 1832:  synonym for Sigapatella novaezelandiae.  
 Crepidula minuta Middendorff, 1849: synonym of Crepidula nummaria Gould, 1846
 Crepidula monoxyla (Lesson, 1831): synonym of Maoricrypta monoxyla (Lesson, 1830)
 Crepidula nautiloides Lesson, 1832: synonym of Crepipatella dilatata (Lamarck, 1822)
 Crepidula navicelloides Carpenter, 1864: synonym of Crepidula nummaria Gould, 1846
 Crepidula nebulata Mabille, 1895: synonym of Crepidula nivea C. B. Adams, 1852
 Crepidula orbella Yokoyama, 1920: synonym of Ergaea walshi (Reeve, 1859)
 Crepidula orbiculata Dall, 1919: synonym of Crepipatella orbiculata (Dall, 1919)
 Crepidula osculans C. B. Adams, 1852: synonym of Phenacolepas osculans (C. B. Adams, 1852)
 Crepidula pallida (Broderip, 1834): synonym of Calyptraea pallida Broderip, 1834
 Crepidula patagonica d'Orbigny, 1841: synonym of Crepipatella patagonica (d'Orbigny, 1841)
 Crepidula patula Deshayes, 1830: synonym of Crepipatella peruviana (Lamarck, 1822)
 Crepidula peruviana Lamarck, 1822: synonym of Crepipatella peruviana (Lamarck, 1822)
 Crepidula plana (A. Adams & Reeve, 1850): synonym of Ergaea walshi (Reeve, 1859)
 Crepidula pulchella Aradas, 1846: synonym of Crepidula unguiformis Lamarck, 1822
 Crepidula rhyssema Olsson & Harbison, 1953: synonym of Crepidula plana Say, 1822
 Crepidula riisei Dunker, 1852: synonym of Crepidula fornicata (Linnaeus, 1758)
 Crepidula rostriformis Gould, 1846: synonym of Crepidula adunca G. B. Sowerby I, 1825
 Crepidula rugosa Carpenter, 1856: synonym of Crepidula onyx G. B. Sowerby I, 1824
 Crepidula rugulosa Dunker, 1846: synonym of Crepipatella capensis (Quoy & Gaimard, 1835)
 Crepidula sandaliformis de Serres, 1830: synonym of Crepidula unguiformis Lamarck, 1822
 Crepidula sandalina Deshayes, 1833: synonym of Crepidula unguiformis Lamarck, 1822
 Crepidula scabies Reeve, 1859: synonym of Ergaea walshi (Reeve, 1859)
 Crepidula sinuosa Turton, 1825: synonym of Crepidula unguiformis Lamarck, 1822
 Crepidula solida Hinds, 1844: synonym of Crepidula adunca G. B. Sowerby I, 1825
 Crepidula squama (Broderip, 1834): synonym of Crepidula striolata Menke, 1851
 Crepidula strigellata Dunker, 1853: synonym of Crepidula striolata Menke, 1851
 Crepidula sulin Dautzenberg, 1912: synonym of Crepidula porcellana Lamarck, 1801
 Crepidula tomentosa Quoy & Gaimard, 1832: synonym of Crepidula aculeata (Gmelin, 1791): synonym of Bostrycapulus aculeatus (Gmelin, 1791)
 Crepidula uncata Menke, 1847: synonym of Crepidula adunca G. B. Sowerby I, 1825
 Crepidula uncinata Philippi, 1887: synonym of Crepidula dilatata Lamarck, 1822: synonym of Crepipatella dilatata (Lamarck, 1822)
 Crepidula virginica Conrad, 1871: synonym of Crepidula fornicata (Linnaeus, 1758)
 Crepidula walshi Reeve, 1859: synonym of Ergaea walshi (Reeve, 1859)
 † Crepidula wilckensi Finlay, 1924: synonym of  † Maoricrypta radiata (Hutton, 1873)
 Crepidula youngi (Powell, 1940): synonym of Maoricrypta youngi Powell, 1940

Species that were previously placed in the genus Crepidula but have subsequently been removed from the genus on the basis of work by Bruce Marshall of the Te Papa Museum and Rachel Collin of the Smithsonian Institution include the following:

Now Maoricrypta:
 Crepidula costata is a synonym for Maoricrypta costata - ribbed slipper shell
 Crepidula youngi (Powell, 1940)
 Crepidula wilckensi Finlay, 1924
 Crepidula immersa G. F. Angas, 1867

Now Grandicrepidula:
 Crepidula grandis Middendorff, 1849: synonym of Grandicrepidula grandis (Middendorff, 1849)
Grandicrepidula collinae  Marshall

Now Siphopatella:
 Crepidula walshi L. A. Reeve, 1859

Synonyms:
 Crepidula maculata Quoy & Gaimard, 1832: synonym of  Crepidula aculeata (Gmelin, 1791)

Ecology
Like all calyptraeids, slipper snails are sedentary filter-feeders. Adults use their large gill to capture microalgae from suspension, but there is some evidence that small juveniles can also use the radula to scrape algae from the substrate.

Introduced and invasive Crepidula species
Crepidula fornicata -  Native to the east coast of North America and ranging from Florida north into Canada.  This species is now widespread and considered highly invasive along the north coast of Spain and France, along much of England's coastline and into the North Sea.  It has also been reported from San Francisco Bay, Puget Sound and the Mediterranean Sea.

Crepidula convexa -  Native to the east coast of North America and ranging from South Carolina to New England.  This species has been reported from Puget Sound and San Francisco Bay.

Crepidula onyx - Native to the Southern coast of California and northern Pacific coast of Mexico. This species is now widespread and considered highly invasive in Asia. It has been reported from Korea, Japan and Hong Kong.

References

Collin, R. 2003. The Utility of Morphological Characters in Gastropod Phylogenetics: An Example From the Calyptraeidae. Biological Journal of the Linnean Society, 4: 541–593
Collin, R. 2003. Phylogenetic Relationships Among Calyptraeid Gastropods and Their Implications for the Biogeography of Marine Speciation. Systematic Biology, 5: 618-640.
Collin, R. 2002. Another Last Word on Crepidula Convexa With a Description of C. Ustulatulina N. Sp. (Gastropoda: Calyptraeidae) From the Gulf of Mexico and Southern Florida. Bulletin of Marine Science, 1: 177-184.
Collin, R. 2000. Phylogeny of the Crepidula plana (Gastropoda: Calyptraeidae) cryptic species complex in North America. Canadian Journal of Zoology. 78: 1500-1514. 
 Hoagland, K.E. 1977. Systematic review of fossil and recent Crepidula and discussion of the evolution of the Calyptraeidae. Malacologia 16(2): 353-420
 Vaught, K.C. (1989). A classification of the living Mollusca. American Malacologists: Melbourne, FL (USA). . XII, 195 pp. (
 Gofas, S.; Le Renard, J.; Bouchet, P. (2001). Mollusca, in: Costello, M.J. et al. (Ed.) (2001). European register of marine species: a check-list of the marine species in Europe and a bibliography of guides to their identification. Collection Patrimoines Naturels, 50: pp. 180–213

External links

  Hoagland K.E. 1983. Notes on type specimens of Crepidula (Prosobranchia: Calyptraeidae) in the Muséum National d’Histoire Naturelle, Paris. Proceedings of the Academy of Natural Sciences, Philadelphia 135: 1–8.
 pfds on calyptraeid taxonomy

Calyptraeidae
Gastropod genera
Taxa named by Jean-Baptiste Lamarck